Lucknow Charbagh (officially Lucknow NR, station code: LKO) is one of the five main railway stations of Lucknow city for  broad gauge trains, the other ones being , Gomti Nagar railway station, Aishbagh Railway Station and Lucknow City. In 19th century, the next important station in the north after Delhi was Lucknow. It was the headquarters of the Oudh and Rohilkhand Railway (O&RR) whose first line from Lucknow to Kanpur was built in April 1867.

Now known as Lucknow Charbagh station, it is part of Northern Railway.

Infrastructure
Built at a price of  70 lakhs, which now values as 2 million Dollars or 14 crore INR In 2021; Lucknow Charbagh was designed by J. H. Horniman. The foundation of the railway station was placed  in March 1914. The building was completed in 1923. A major role in its design and planning was carried out by Chaubey Mukta Prasad, a consulting engineer for Ms Lanebrown and Hulett. It has a large garden in front of the building. It incorporates the mix of Rajput, Awadhi and Mughal architecture and has a palatial appearance. Architecturally, it is considered one of the most beautiful railway stations in India. The Government Railway Police station at Lucknow Charbagh holds an ISO 9001 certificate.

Platforms 
The station has 9 platforms.

Gallery

References

External links

Railway stations in Lucknow
Lucknow NR railway division
Railway stations opened in 1914
Indo-Saracenic Revival architecture
1914 establishments in India